DigitaOS was a short lived digital camera operating system created by Flashpoint Technology and used on various Kodak, Pentax, and HP cameras in the late 1990s. DigitaOS debuted with the Kodak DC220 on 20 May 1998, and was released on a total of 11 camera models before it was abandoned in 2001. DigitaOS was notable for its ability to run third party software, a concept that was not again realized until the release of various Android based digital cameras in the early 2010s.

DigitaOS applications were programmed either as JIT compiled scripts using "Digita Script", or AOT compiled programs written in C using an official SDK. The operating system abstracted away most camera functionality and hardware platform differences, allowing software to be compatible with most DigitaOS cameras. Additionally, DigitaOS handled the GUI presented to the user and basic camera functionality.

Because of its ability to run third party software, several games were ported to it. The most notable of these being DOOM and MAME.

Cameras using DigitaOS 

 Kodak DC220
 Kodak DC260
 Kodak DC265
 Kodak DC290
 Minolta Dimage 1500 EX
 Minolta 1500 3D
 HP C500 Photosmart
 HP C618 Photosmart
 HP C912 Photosmart
 PENTAX EI-200
 PENTAX EI-2000

References 

1998 software
Discontinued operating systems